Kol Tappeh may refer to:
 Kol Tappeh, Ardabil
 Kol Tappeh, West Azerbaijan